Sergey Alexandrovich Shargunov (born 12 May 1980, Moscow) is a Russian political figure and a deputy of the 7th and 8th State Dumas.
 
Sergey Shargunov is the son of the clergyman . While studying at the Moscow State University, Shargunov worked as an assistant to the deputy of the State Duma Tatyana Astrakhankina. At the age of 19, he started working at the Novy Mir. From 2002 to 2003, he worked as a correspondent at the Novaya Gazeta. From 2003 to 2007, he worked at the Nezavisimaya Gazeta. In 2004, he co-founded the Youth Movement "Ura!" that cooperated with the Rodina. In 2006, Sharguniv joined the A Just Russia — For Truth. In 2013, he worked as a columnist at the Kommersant FM radio station. He also wrote a blog on the website of the Echo of Moscow radio station. In 2016 and 2021, he was elected deputy of the 7th and 8th State Dumas, respectively.

References
 

 

1987 births
Living people
Communist Party of the Russian Federation members
21st-century Russian politicians
Eighth convocation members of the State Duma (Russian Federation)
Politicians from Moscow
Yunost editors